The Puerta de San Fernando was a gate of the walled enclosure of Seville, Spain.

It was in the mouth of the straight and spacious street of the same name, at the height of the former Royal Tobacco Factory, now University of Seville. Also known as Puerta Nueva and no wonder since it was built in the middle of the 18th century, specifically in 1760.

Description 

Draws the attention the monumentality of the gate, escorted in turn by the two crenellated towers that made faithful squires in its past defensive duties.

This gate had its two fronts unequal in architecture, as belonging Doric to the outside and Ionic on the inside. In each of those appeared four columns on pedestals, two on each side of the arch, which had of light 4'18 m. and 7.52 m. in front of the high and solid lateral towers.

Demolition 
This gate had a short life, one century. In City Hall of September 9, 1864 it was decided to demolish this gate, but having emerged some difficulties by Mr. Administrator of the Royal Heritage defending the ownership of this monument, as belonging to the Royal House, being saved in those days of suffering fate reserved for other Sevillan gates, although the revolutionary pickaxe turned into rubble after auctioned, along with that of Osario and Carmona in 1868.

See also
Walls of Seville

References

City gates in Spain
Demolished buildings and structures in Seville
Buildings and structures completed in 1760
Former gates
Buildings and structures demolished in the 1860s